Narandran "Jody" Kollapen (born 19 May 1957) is a Judge of the Constitutional Court of South Africa. He was appointed by President of South Africa Cyril Ramaphosa on 24 December 2021, and began his service on 1 January 2022. He had previously served as an acting justice of the Constitutional Court for a six-month period during 2017.

Prior to his appointment to the Constitutional Court, Kollapen served as a justice of the High Court of South Africa, Gauteng Division (Gauteng High Court) during January 2011 to December 2021 and as an acting justice of the Gauteng Division during January 2010 to December 2011. Other highlights of his career include appointment to the South African Human Rights Commission (SAHRC) in 1997, of which he held the position of chairman for seven years (2002–2009), and as national director of Lawyers for Human Rights (LHR) during 1995 through the end of 1996.

Early life and education 
Kollapen was born on 19 May 1957 to working class Tamil South African parents at the Holy Cross Health Care Centre in the Lady Selborne suburb of Pretoria, South Africa. His father, Kanabathy 'Billy' Kollapen, was a waiter and his mother, Rajanbal 'Thanga' Kollapen, was a machinist at a clothing factory. Kollapen has described his mother as "quite politically involved" and "a fighter for justice" who was active in anti-Apartheid passive resistance campaigns with other women from Transvaal and was twice jailed in Pietermaritzburg for participation in passive protests in the 1950s. She participated in the Women's March on 9 August 1956 and Kollapen has often recalled that she told him she was pregnant with him at the time of the march.

The family lived in the Marabastad business area near the city centre of Pretoria until 1968, when Kollapen was 12 years old, at which time the Group Areas Act drove them to relocate to Laudium, an 'Indian township' created under Apartheid in 1960–61. Kollapen has characterized the area where he grew up as "what could be described as the District 6 of Pretoria, with a mixed-race community, and in many ways a glorified slum."

An uncle worked as a "kind of paralegal" – though he had not studied the law and lacked the qualifications to claim the profession, he worked extensively with lawyers and gained "some legal knowledge" – and he assisted people in the community by providing advice and connecting them with lawyers. Kollapen decided to pursue law as a teen, inspired by both his uncle and his mother.

After matriculating at Laudium High School in 1974, he left home to pursue a law degree at the University of Durban-Westville (successor to the Indian University College) in Westville, Natal (now KwaZulu-Natal). As a 'non-white' student, the Extension of University Education Act prevented him from registering at a university that was open prior to the 1959 passing of the act and his options were limited to Westville. The act was relaxed in 1977–78 and Kollapen was permitted to study at the University of the Witwatersrand (more commonly called Wits University or Wits) in Johannesburg, where he was a member of the Black Students Society and obtained his  (BProc) and Legum Doctor (LLD) in 1981.

Career 
After moving back to Laudium, Kollapen began his legal career as an articled clerk at the law firm Savage, Jooste and Adams in Pretoria. He opened his own practice in 1982 with R200 capital and himself as the only employee. On the daily bus ride from Laudium to the city business district, he assumed a role in the community similar to that of his uncle: I was given two seats, of which the second seat would be occupied by other commuters at 10 minute intervals. I gave them advice. It was just working-class people who needed some assistance. I never earned any money out of it but for me, it was lovely in the sense that I was able to use my knowledge and skills to help people.

During his time as a human rights lawyer, he was involved in a number of high-profile cases such as the trial of the Sharpeville Six, the Delmas Treason Trial, and the South African Medical and Dental Council's case against the government-employed medical practitioners who failed to appropriately diagnose and treat anti-Apartheid activist Steve Biko, who died in police custody in 1977. He also acted as a correspondent in Pretoria for Priscilla Jana, who was based in Johannesburg for much of the 1980s.

He began working with Lawyers for Human Rights (LHR), a South African non-governmental organization, in the early-1990s and served as its national director from January 1995 through 1996. At LHR, he coordinated the organization's 'Release Political Prisoners' program, which championed the rights of political prisoners. Wayne Ncube, the national director of LHR , described Kollapen as "one of [the LHR's] most renowned former directors" and as someone who has "always been on the right side of history, even at times when it was not convenient to do so and sometimes dangerous to do so."

Other activities 
In 2011, Kollapen was an extraordinary lecturer at the Centre for Human Rights at the University of Pretoria.

References

Further reading

External links
"SA's new human rights chief"  Southafrica.info

1957 births
Living people
21st-century South African judges
Human rights lawyers
Judges of the Constitutional Court of South Africa
People from Centurion, Gauteng
People from Pretoria
20th-century South African lawyers
South African people of Tamil descent
University of Durban-Westville alumni
Academic staff of the University of Pretoria
University of the Witwatersrand alumni